Helene Funke (3 September 1869 – 31 July 1957) was a German-Austrian painter and graphic designer of modern times.

Life and work 
As the daughter of an industrialist family, Funke studied painting against the will of the family from 1899 at the Munich Ladies' Academy. From 1905 and until 1913, she lived in France and then moved to Vienna until her death.

In 1918 she became a member of the artist group "movement" or "free movement" (from 1919). In addition, she was a member of the group of Viennese women's art. In 1928 she received the Austrian State Prize for the picture Tobias and the Angel . "Their pictures often show women's groups or women's couples and represent a differentiated examination of the topic of femininity." (Geheimsache Leben, 2005)

From 1904 to 1938, she has exhibited in Munich, Berlin, Dresden, Leipzig ( BUGRA 1914) and Hamburg; she was also a member of the Deutscher Künstlerbund. In France, they had close contact with the Fauves. In Vienna, she was exhibited in the Vienna Secession, in the Société des artistes Indépendants in Paris, and at the Vienna Art Show. She was rediscovered during the last years before her death.

Oskar Laske immortalized her in his monumental painting "The Ship of Fools" (to be seen in the Belvedere, Vienna). In 1957, Helene Funke died in her apartment in Vienna.

Funke was then rediscovered in 1998 with a first retrospective at Kunsthandel Hieke and then in 2007, during an extensive retrospective in Lentos, Linz. In 2018, she was exhibited in her birthplace, Chemnitz, Germany.

Her work was included in the 2019 exhibition City Of Women: Female artists in Vienna from 1900 to 1938 at the Österreichische Galerie Belvedere.

References

External links 
 images of Funke's work on MutualArt
 
 Erste Retrospektive Helene Funkes, 3. Mai – 11. September 2007
 Ich bin ein einsamer Steppenwolf. 
 Helene Funke biography at Kunsthandel Hieke
 Expressive female. Helene Funke

1867 births
1957 deaths
Austrian graphic designers
German women painters